The Monument in Memory of the Fallen Polish Airmen in World War II in Warsaw commemorates Polish airmen who died in World War II.

See also 
 Polish Air Forces (Polish Defence War of 1939)
 Polish Air Forces in France and Great Britain
 Polish Air Forces in the USSR

Monuments and memorials in Warsaw
Polish Air Force
2003 sculptures
2003 establishments in Poland
World War II monuments and memorials in Poland